Jennifer Martz (born July 13, 1977) is an American former volleyball player.

Career
As a  junior middle blocker at Washington University in St. Louis, Missouri, Martz was named 1997 American Volleyball Coaches Association (AVCA) Division III Player of the Year.  That year she led the Bears to their 9th consecutive Final Four appearance and 10th University Athletic Association championship in 11 years.  As a freshman and sophomore, she led the Bears to their 5th and 6th consecutive national championships.  She was a finalist for the NCAA 25th Anniversary (of NCAA Women's Championships) team.

Martz was one of only four Division III four-time All-Americans (three first-team selections). Martz graduated as Washington University's all-time leader in kills (2,068), blocks (588) and games played (549) and finished second in hitting percentage (.443) and attacks (3,634).  She was inducted into the Washington University Sports Hall of Fame on January 26, 2007.

Honors
NCAA All tournament team (1995, 96) 
AVCA All American (1995, 96, 97, 98)
1997 AVCA Division III National Player of the Year
1999 NCAA Division III Missouri Woman of the Year
1998 GTE/College Sports Information Directors of America (CoSIDA) second-team Academic All-American.

References

1977 births
American women's volleyball players
Living people
Washington University Bears athletes
Middle blockers
Washington University in St. Louis alumni